Litoporus is a genus of cellar spiders that was first described by Eugène Louis Simon in 1893.

Species
 it contains eleven species, found only in South America:
Litoporus aerius Simon, 1893 (type) – Venezuela
Litoporus agricola Mello-Leitão, 1922 – Brazil
Litoporus dimona Huber, 2000 – Brazil
Litoporus iguassuensis Mello-Leitão, 1918 – Brazil
Litoporus lopez Huber, 2000 – Colombia
Litoporus manu Huber, 2000 – Peru
Litoporus pakitza Huber, 2000 – Peru
Litoporus saul Huber, 2000 – French Guiana
Litoporus secoya Huber, 2000 – Colombia
Litoporus uncatus (Simon, 1893) – Northern South America
Litoporus yucumo Huber, 2000 – Bolivia

See also
 List of Pholcidae species

References

Araneomorphae genera
Pholcidae
Spiders of South America